Bertram Kostant (May 24, 1928 – February 2, 2017) was an American mathematician who worked in representation theory, differential geometry, and mathematical physics.

Early life and education
Kostant grew up in New York City, where he graduated from Stuyvesant High School in 1945.  He went on to obtain an undergraduate degree in mathematics from Purdue University in 1950. He earned his Ph.D. from the University of Chicago in 1954, under the direction of Irving Segal, where he wrote a dissertation on representations of Lie groups.

Career in mathematics
After time at the Institute for Advanced Study, Princeton University, and the University of California, Berkeley, he joined the faculty at the Massachusetts Institute of Technology, where he remained until his retirement in 1993. Kostant's work has involved  representation theory, Lie groups, Lie algebras, homogeneous spaces, differential geometry and mathematical physics, particularly symplectic geometry. He has given several lectures on the Lie group E8. He has been one of the principal developers of the theory of geometric quantization. His introduction of the theory of prequantization has led to the theory of quantum Toda lattices. The Kostant partition function is named after him.  With Gerhard Hochschild and Alex F. T. W. Rosenberg, he is one of the namesakes of the Hochschild–Kostant–Rosenberg theorem which describes the Hochschild homology of some algebras.

His students include James Harris Simons, James Lepowsky, Moss Sweedler, David Vogan, and Birgit Speh. At present he has more than 100 mathematical descendants.

Awards and honors

Kostant was a Guggenheim Fellow in 1959-60 (in Paris), and a Sloan Fellow in 1961-63. In 1962 he was elected to the American Academy of Arts and Sciences, and in 1978 to the National Academy of Sciences. In 1982 he was a fellow of the Sackler Institute for Advanced Studies at Tel Aviv University. In 1990 he was awarded the Steele Prize of the American Mathematical Society, in recognition of his 1975 paper, “On the existence and irreducibility of certain series of representations.”

In 2001, Kostant was a Chern Lecturer and Chern Visiting Professor at Berkeley. He received honorary degrees from the University of Córdoba in Argentina in 1989, the University of Salamanca in Spain in 1992, and Purdue University in 1997. The latter, from his alma mater, was an honorary Doctor of Science degree, citing his fundamental contributions to mathematics and the inspiration he and his work provided to generations of researchers.

In May 2008, the Pacific Institute for Mathematical Sciences hosted a conference: “Lie Theory and Geometry: the Mathematical Legacy of Bertram Kostant,” at the University of British Columbia, celebrating the life and work of Kostant in his 80th year. In 2012, he was elected to the inaugural class of fellows of the American Mathematical Society. In the last year of his life, Kostant traveled to Rio de Janeiro for the Colloquium on Group Theoretical Methods in Physics, where he received the prestigious Wigner Medal, “for his fundamental contributions to representation theory that led to new branches of mathematics and physics.”

Selected publications

 with Louis Auslander: 
 with Stephen Rallis: 

 with David Kazhdan and Shlomo Sternberg: 

 with Shrawan Kumar: 
with Shlomo Sternberg: 

 with Gerhard Hochschild and Alex Rosenberg:  (Reprinted from Trans. Amer. Math. Soc., vol. 102, no. 3, March 1962, pp. 383–408)
 (Reprinted from the Amer. J. Math., vol. 81, no. 4, Oct. 1959)

See also
Chern's conjecture (affine geometry)
Supermanifold
Symplectic spinor bundle

Notes

References
Kostant's home page at MIT

1928 births
2017 deaths
20th-century American mathematicians
21st-century American mathematicians
Members of the United States National Academy of Sciences
Fellows of the American Mathematical Society
Institute for Advanced Study visiting scholars
Stuyvesant High School alumni
Purdue University alumni
University of Chicago alumni
Princeton University faculty
University of California, Berkeley faculty
Massachusetts Institute of Technology faculty
People from Brooklyn
Mathematicians from New York (state)